Amirabad Haq Nader (also Romanized as Amīrābād Haq Nader; also known as Amīrābād) is a village in Yusefvand Rural District, in the Central District of Selseleh County, Lorestan Province, Iran. At the 2006 census, its population was 238, in 43 families.

References 

Towns and villages in Selseleh County